Highway 181 (AR 181, Ark. 181, and Hwy. 181) is a designation for five segments of state highways in Mississippi County. A western route of  runs from U.S. Route 61 (US 61) in Bassett to Interstate 55 (I-55). A second route, consisting of four segments connected by other state highways, of a total length of  begins at Highway 14 in Marie and runs north to Missouri SSR-NN.

Route description

Bassett to I-55
Highway 181 begins at US 61 in Bassett and runs west to Interstate 55. This highway segment does not have any junctions with other state highways.

Marie to Missouri
Highway 181 runs north from Highway 14 in Marie to cross Interstate 55. The route meets Highway 140 north of Keiser and Highway 158 near Victoria. A brief concurrency begins with Highway 18 near Dell. The highway passes the Widner-Magers Farm Historic District and continues north then east at Woodland Corner. Highway 181 next turns southeast with Highway 151 into Gosnell. The route then turns north to terminate at MO-SSR-NN at the Missouri state line.

Major intersections
Mile markers reset at concurrencies.

|-
| colspan=4 align=center | Highway 181 begins at Marie
|-

|-
| colspan=4 align=center |  concurrency east, 
|-

|-
| align=center colspan=4 |  concurrency east, 
|-

|-
| colspan=4 align=center |  concurrency south,

See also

References

External links

181
Transportation in Mississippi County, Arkansas